The 1994 PPG/Firestone Indy Lights Championship consisted of 12 races. Englishman Steve Robertson edged out André Ribeiro for the championship by 9 points. Both drivers captured four victories.

Calendar

Race summaries

Phoenix race
Held April 10 at Phoenix International Raceway. Greg Moore won the pole.

Top Five Results
 Greg Moore
 Steve Robertson
 Eddie Lawson
 André Ribeiro
 Markus Liesner

Long Beach race
Held April 17 at Long Beach, California Street Course. Eddie Lawson won the pole.

Top Five Results
 Steve Robertson
 Greg Moore
 Pedro Chaves
 Nick Firestone
 David DeSilva

Milwaukee race
Held June 5 at The Milwaukee Mile. André Ribeiro won the pole.

Top Five Results
 Steve Robertson
 Eddie Lawson
 Greg Moore
 David Pook
 Rob Wilson

Detroit race
Held June 12 at Belle Isle Raceway. Steve Robertson won the pole.

Top Five Results
 Steve Robertson
 Eddie Lawson
 Pedro Chaves
 André Ribeiro
 Nick Firestone

Portland race
Held June 26 at Portland International Raceway. André Ribeiro won the pole.

Top Five Results
 André Ribeiro
 Pedro Chaves
 Eddie Lawson
 Steve Robertson
 Greg Moore

Cleveland race
Held July 10 at Burke Lakefront Airport. Pedro Chaves won the pole.

Top Five Results
 Eddie Lawson
 Greg Moore
 Pedro Chaves
 Nick Firestone
 André Ribeiro

Toronto race
Held July 17 at Exhibition Place. Greg Moore won the pole.

Top Five Results
 Steve Robertson
 André Ribeiro
 Nick Firestone
 Alex Padilla
 Eddie Lawson

Mid-Ohio race
Held August 14 at The Mid-Ohio Sports Car Course. André Ribeiro won the pole.

Top Five Results
 André Ribeiro
 Eddie Lawson
 Pedro Chaves
 Steve Robertson
 Nick Firestone

Loudon race
Held August 21 at New Hampshire International Speedway. Steve Robertson won the pole.

Top Five Results
 Greg Moore
 André Ribeiro
 Steve Robertson
 Alex Padilla
 Pedro Chaves

Vancouver race
Held September 4 at Pacific Place. Alex Padilla won the pole.

Top Five Results
 André Ribeiro
 Steve Robertson
 Alex Padilla
 Pedro Chaves
 Greg Moore

Nazareth race
Held September 18 at Nazareth Speedway. Bob Dorricott, Jr. won the pole.

Top Five Results
 Greg Moore
 André Ribeiro
 Jeff Ward
 Steve Robertson
 Eddie Lawson

Laguna Seca race
Held October 9 at Mazda Raceway Laguna Seca. André Ribeiro won the pole.

Top Five Results
 André Ribeiro
 Pedro Chaves
 Eddie Lawson
 Doug Boyer
 Greg Moore

Final points standings

Driver

For every race the points were awarded: 20 points to the winner, 16 for runner-up, 14 for third place, 12 for fourth place, 10 for fifth place, 8 for sixth place, 6 seventh place, winding down to 1 points for 12th place. Additional points were awarded to the pole winner (1 point) and to the driver leading the most laps (1 point).

Complete Overview

R20=retired, but classified NS=did not start

References 

Indy Lights seasons
Indy Lights Season, 1994
Indy Lights
1994 in motorsport